Hedley Grant Pearson Chapman (born 27 April 1949) is an Australian politician.

Born in Adelaide, South Australia, Chapman was educated at Prince Alfred College and the University of Adelaide and worked as a marketing executive in the oil industry and a self-employed management consultant prior to gaining Liberal Party pre-selection for the federal Division of Kingston in the House of Representatives leading to his election in Malcolm Fraser's 1975 landslide win. In the 1980 election, Chapman held Kingston by 358 votes and served in the House of Representatives until his defeat at the 1983 federal election.

Chapman expressed opposition to the development of the Franklin River Dam. After visiting the area he said: "It is a superb area. The visit reinforced my view that it would be a travesty if the dam went ahead."

Chapman unsuccessfully sought preselection for the new seat of Mayo in 1984, and unsuccessfully contested the state electorate of Fisher at the 1985 state election, but returned to federal politics in 1987 as a member of the Australian Senate representing South Australia.

He was defeated at the 2007 election when he was third on the SA Liberal ticket but only two Liberal candidates were elected.

In September 2010, Chapman was elected unopposed as President of the Liberal Party of Australia (South Australian Division) and was re-elected unopposed in 2011 and 2012.

Personal life 
Chapman is the joint-owner of the long-term lease over  Wallerberdina Station, which is one of three properties short-listed for the prospective development of nuclear waste storage facility in South Australia.

References

External links

Biography for CHAPMAN, Hedley Grant Pearson, Parliament of Australia, accessed 29 Dec 2015
 

1949 births
Living people
Liberal Party of Australia members of the Parliament of Australia
Members of the Australian House of Representatives
Members of the Australian House of Representatives for Kingston
Members of the Australian Senate
Members of the Australian Senate for South Australia
People educated at Prince Alfred College
21st-century Australian politicians
20th-century Australian politicians